Kari Jobe is the eponymous debut album by Christian music singer Kari Jobe. The album was released on February 10, 2009 by Integrity Media and Gateway Create Publishing. The album reached No. 67 on the Billboard 200, and No. 3 on the Billboard Christian music chart. Featured on the album are Jobe's first singles, "I'm Singing" and "Healer". "I'm Singing" debuted at No. 13 on the Billboard Christian music charts and "Healer" debuted at No. 33 on the Billboard Soft A/C chart. Alongside the original album, Jobe released Le Canto, a Spanish language version of the album. Le Canto won a Dove Award in 2010 for Best Spanish Language Album of the Year.

Track listing

Personnel 
 Kari Jobe – lead vocals, backing vocals (1, 4, 5, 7, 10)
 Jason Webb – keyboards (1, 2, 5-8, 11)
 Matt Gilder – keyboards (3, 4)
 Jeff Roach – keyboards (7, 10, 12)
 Ed Cash – acoustic guitar (1-5, 8-11), electric guitar (1-5, 7, 8, 11), backing vocals (1, 4, 8, 11), mandolin (3, 8), harmony vocals (3), programming (4, 5, 8)
 Paul Moak – electric guitar (1-8, 10, 11, 12)
 Matt Pierson – bass (1-4, 9, 10)
 Chris Donohue – bass (5-8, 11, 12)
 Josh Robinson – drums (1-4, 9, 10, 12)
 Steve Brewster – drums (5-8, 11)
 Caleb Jobe – percussion (8)
 David Davidson – violin (1, 2, 12)
 John Catchings – cello (6, 9)
 Dick Hensold – Northumbrian pipes (11)
 Frances Cash – backing vocals (3)
 Ryan Edgar – harmony vocals (6, 10), backing vocals (8)

Production 
 Ed Cash – producer, engineer, mixing (4, 5, 6, 8-12)
 Thomas Miller – executive producer, art direction 
 Paul Moak – engineer 
 Matt Armstrong – assistant engineer 
 F. Reid Shippen – mixing (1, 2, 3, 7)
 Buckley Miller – mix assistant (1, 2, 3, 7)
 Bob Ludwig – mastering 
 Craig Dunnagan – A&R 
 Jay King – A&R
 Anita Fulkerson – production manager 
 Kari Jobe – art direction
 Alena Moore – art direction
 Sam Noerr – art direction
 Gary Dorsey – design 
 Eric Ryan Anderson – cover photography 
 Jessica Sheppard – inside photography 
 Grant Jenkins – management 
 Steve Rice – song development

Charts

References

2009 debut albums
Kari Jobe albums
Columbia Records albums
Spanish-language albums